Partnership to End Addiction, first known as the Partnership for a Drug-Free America (PDFA) then later as the Partnership at DrugFree.org, and The Partnership for Drug-Free Kids, is a New York City-based non-profit organization which runs campaigns to prevent teenage drug and alcohol use in the United States. It is notable for mobilizing volunteer talent "against a single social problem" to help young people "live their lives free of drug and alcohol abuse," and to assist parents in prevention efforts. The organization gets input from scientists, specialists in communication, researchers and others, and offers resources for parents and teenagers on its website. It focused efforts to "unsell" illegal drugs such as cocaine, heroin, prescription drugs, marijuana, MDMA, and others, as well as discouraging the use of alcohol and nitrous oxide, by breaking away from a standard public service approach and doing a coordinated media campaign. While the organization has focused drug prevention advertising on broadcast media such as television, there are signs in recent years that it is shifting media support to emerging channels such as video-on-demand, digital technology and particularly the Internet. The organization's marketing experience was written up as a 58-page marketing "case study" for study by students at the Harvard Business School. The organization is perhaps best known for its iconic TV ad This Is Your Brain on Drugs, but it had made over 3,000 ads by 2011 while pursuing a flexible strategy.

History

Strategic vision
In the mid-1980s, a small group of advertising professionals with wide–ranging experience on diverse campaigns, and working in conjunction with a nonprofit trade association called the American Association of Advertising Agencies, proposed a marketing campaign not to sell one more product or service, but rather to un-sell teenaged drug use. The group was formed officially in 1985. Among the initial group was Los Angeles "ad guru" Phillip Joanou, Thomas Hedrick, Doria Steedman, and Ginna Marston from the Ted Bates advertising agency. The group saw the merits of using a focused approach similar to that for a commercial product or service. In earlier decades, public service ads or PSAs had been shown by networks whenever it had been convenient for their schedules, regardless of the intended audience of the ad. Many PSAs aired late at night when most people had gone to sleep. In other situations, networks used PSAs as filler when slots opened up in their commercial lineup regardless of any consideration for reaching specific audiences. Marston urged, instead, a targeted focused anti-drug campaign similar to one for selling a specific brand of cereal or an automobile, but instead, the campaign would unsell drugs or rather sell the benefits of not using drugs. Like a commercial campaign, the effort would conduct marketing research by studying teenagers and parents in depth using focus groups to understand their motivations, as well as conduct quantitative research using nationwide random-sample surveys as part of a recurring longitudinal investigation.

Hedrick agreed that the group knew "next to nothing about illegal drugs and the youthful target audience for their ads," according to a report in the Los Angeles Times. These realizations led to the creation of a "full-time and highly aggressive research staff" according to one report. The team reached out to knowledgeable activists such as Carole Fields-Arnold, who Marston later described as "one of those rare people who is street smart, and can be tough when needed, but also gets everyone to look up and see the light, dream a bigger dream than they thought they could and lock arms to reach for it together." The organization was loosely modeled along the lines of a standard advertising agency, with a creative director post and "account executives" to spearhead specific efforts. While the campaign approach was a radical departure from standard PSA approaches, the group was following a tried–and– true advertising strategy: research, choosing a marketing objective, writing advertisements to meet that objective, plus focused efforts to persuade that audience in chosen media at specific times. The intent was to change behavior by changing attitudes. Further, the agency did continual reassessments: were attitudes changing? was drug use becoming less prominent? This feedback helped the group decide if goals were being met, and allowed them to change tactics accordingly. An account of the overall idea:

The agency found itself able to solicit help from many sources, for free. Copywriters often competed for assignments on a pro bono basis. The agency finagled free media exposure from print media and broadcast networks including spots during prime time. Later, when advertising was directed at inner-city youth, media was selected to target 37 large cities. The organization has turned to media planning and placement experts who work, as well, on a pro bono basis. One report suggested that there was a wealth of creative talent vying for a chance for assignments. The group was prepared to feature rather risqué push–the–envelope ads; for example, one advertisement showed a girl with the "barrel of a revolver pushed up one nostril and a father singing a lullaby to his little daughter from his coffin." Doria Steedman described the ads as neither pretty nor polite nor nice but designed deliberately to "disturb and upset." A bandwagon effect happened soon thereafter: big advertising agencies including Saatchi & Saatchi, J. Walter Thompson, BBDO Worldwide joined the consortium. Key executives from The New York Times Company, Procter & Gamble, USA Network and others such as Daniel Burke of Capital Cities sat on the Partnership's board of directors.

Funding

The Partnership found office space on the 16th floor of the Chrysler Building in New York City. By 1993, it had 30 employees, according to one estimate. An early grant of $300,000 from the American Association of Advertising Agencies helped considerably to pay for rent, salaries, and other expenses, and subsequent funds were provided by generous grants from the Robert Wood Johnson Foundation, a Princeton-based philanthropic organization focusing exclusively on health care and particularly substance use disorders. The foundation's founder, Robert Wood Johnson II, had built the family firm of Johnson & Johnson into an international health care products manufacturer, and he left the foundation a generous bequest of stock upon his death in 1968. In addition to these revenue sources, the organization also holds fundraisers, including an annual awards dinner; in 2007, one awards dinner at the Waldorf-Astoria Hotel raised $2.2 million.

This Is Your Brain on Drugs
Analysis of research suggested that consumers decided about possibly doing drugs based on two basic considerations: the risk involved, and the perception of social disapproval. And campaigns were targeted towards both mindsets: that using drugs was risky and that it was uncool among peer groups.

The organization first entered the wider public consciousness in 1987, with its This Is Your Brain on Drugs broadcast and print public service advertisements (PSAs). The advertisement used the analogy that if a person's brain is an egg, then using illegal drugs would be like frying it. This advertisement was shown repeatedly on broadcast media to the extent that it became a hallmark for the organization. Time magazine described the advertisement as "iconic". It has been recognized by marketing professionals as "one of the most influential" ad campaigns in the history of marketing, according to numerous sources, and has been applauded as one of the "most unforgettable images in modern American advertising." TV Guide named it as one of the "top 100 ads of all time". The ad became the organization's "calling card", according to one account.

 Student Taia Lubitz felt the "brain on drugs" commercial was not accurate, since she saw fellow students smoking marijuana whose brains were clearly not frying. She claimed that the ad "stirred her curiosity" and that the scare tactic was really more of a "dare" tactic.
 Student Sepideh Modrek said that "The fried egg commercial really scared me when I was in high school. I remember picturing that egg in the frying pan and thinking that it wasn't worth it."

The agency was able to solicit generous donations of free media time with an estimated worth of "$1 million worth of advertising every day" for more than a decade, totaling more than $2 billion in free space and time, according to one estimate. Copywriters from big-city agencies in Los Angeles, Chicago, New York and elsewhere from "250 big-name ad agencies" contributed their creative expertise.

There were other commercials with a bite, too. For example, in one commercial an angry father grills his son about where he learned to smoke pot, and his teenage son retorts ironically: "YOU, alright!? I learned it by watching you!" with the narrator concluding, "Parents who use drugs have children who use drugs."

Coordination with federal anti-drug efforts
The agency coordinated efforts with government officials in their efforts to stem illegal drugs. However, the relationship between the Partnership and the federal government was sometimes marked by disagreements. In 2002, the White House director of the Office of National Drug Control Policy, John P. Walters, questioned whether the Partnership's campaigns were lessening the use of illegal drugs. Partnership chairman James E. Burke argued before a Senate subcommittee for better targeting of funds for media purchases. Burke complained of improper interpretations of survey data as well as the federal government shifting $50 million away from vital media purchases. Burke called for simplicity and focus:

The Partnership holds a special position under law within the National Youth Anti-Drug Media Campaign of the Office of National Drug Control Policy. It cooperates with government agencies in many initiatives to try to help reduce drug use. In 2010, it worked with the Drug Enforcement Administration in 2010 on a public relations event entitled "National Prescription Drug Take-Back Day." The event involved 4,000 so-called "drop spots" for people to discard extra prescription drugs as a way to lessen the temptation for their misuse.

The 1990s
In 1989, Johnson & Johnson chief executive James E. Burke took over leadership of the organization. He had been instrumental in growing the large pharmaceutical firm as well as adeptly handling a difficult crisis "in a forthright way" with "decisive leadership" when a terrorist had poisoned bottles of one of the company's products and caused several deaths. Burke brought new contacts and savvy to the operation and a reputation for the highest ethical standards.

In 1992, the Partnership switched focus somewhat to targeting inner-city youth, where the drug problem had been more severe, and ran a campaign led by Ginna Marston. Research suggested most children felt "nearly alone in their hostility toward drugs," so an effort was made to show them that they were not alone. In one television commercial, a camera zooms in and out on two youngsters, one of whom is trying to get the other to try a marijuana cigarette, but the other youngster declines; the tagline says "A friend who offers you drugs is not your friend." It was a "strikingly different tack" from the milder Just Say No campaign championed by previous first lady Nancy Reagan. Commercials written by a former Wieden & Kennedy copywriter were "infused with menace and melodrama" according to one report. Some spots by a Goodby, Berlin & Silverstein copy team hinted that the earlier Just Say No had been simplistic. Marston explained the utility of depicting young people "resisting drugs in real situations":

The organization picked up real-life stories about the effects of drug use and used these stories at times in its commercials. For example, a 28-year-old former drug user met for lunch with the Partnership's Doria Steedman, and at one point "pulled out her [false] teeth" to show the ravages of the drug use; this idea was used in a subsequent commercial. At the same time, different drugs were coming in and out of vogue, sometimes introduced by films such as Trainspotting.

In 1994, an independent assessment from the Johns Hopkins School of Medicine suggested that the anti-drug campaign was having a measurable "deterrence effect" on American adolescents:

Research efforts suggested that a key metric for the agency was getting preteens and teenagers to wait longer and longer before having their "first taste of drugs" since the longer wait period meant that it became less and less likely that a child would become a regular drug user.

But it had to contend with a pop culture that often used drugs to promote partying, feeling good, and as a stimulus for musical creativity. A music executive commented anonymously in 1996:

In 1996, Partnership director Ginna Marston noticed, after examining survey data, trends indicating that not just teenagers, but preteens were showing greater smoking of marijuana and that the problem could no longer be viewed as a "teenage problem only." At a press conference, Marston told reporters of a new media blitz aimed at "getting parents involved in the war against drugs. Survey data showed marijuana use had gone from 230,000 children in 1995 to 460,000 children in 1996, according to the report. In addition, there continued to be high-profile deaths of celebrities who had overdosed, such as Jonathan Melvoin of the group The Smashing Pumpkins, which put pressure on the music industry to take a serious look at drug influence in pop music. While Rock 'n' roll music has been described as "steeped in rebellion," there is a long list of musicians who have used heroin, including John Lennon, Keith Richards, Bob Dylan, Buffy Sainte-Marie, Jim Morrison, Jerry Garcia, Jimi Hendrix, Janis Joplin and Eric Clapton, Kurt Cobain, Shannon Hoon, Courtney Love, Scott Weiland, Anthony Kiedis, Layne Staley, David Gahan and others. While heroin can give a "relaxing, euphoric high" lasting for six hours, the body grows increasingly tolerant and more is needed until addicts must keep using the drug to stave off withdrawal.

The Partnership turned images of glamour upside down by juxtaposing the illusory world of drugs versus the reality:

Television jingle accompanying black-and-white footage of a grimy boy twitching and retching into a filthy toilet

Since the agency had been tracking usage and attitudes, it adapted to changing circumstances. Marston and other executives adjusted their media strategy accordingly as fast-moving trends made one drug "hot" while others fell out of favor. The campaign was primarily oriented towards television and print media. An analysis of the Partnership's efforts by Forbes magazine around this time suggested that it had earned "a single-brand advertising clout" comparable to McDonald's while noting that the fast-food franchisor outspent the Partnership by a ratio of "2 to 1."

The Partnership coordinated efforts with Drug Czar Barry McCaffrey, a retired general who was the director of the Office of National Drug Control Policy, in targeting efforts against heroin. McCaffrey endorsed the Partnership's campaigns and spoke at their news conferences. Later, it worked with state alliance programs.

In 1998, Marston noticed how game maker Fox Interactive had marketed its game N2O as being the "ultimate rush" and how game designers had used "the music and images of the drug-infused rave scene to appeal to hip consumers", according to one report. Marston criticized the blatant approach:

During these years, it was a continuing effort to persuade media sources to provide the best spots and airtime. Newspapers such as the New York Times and Washington Post had generously given prime full-page spots for their ads, but "few other papers have been so generous", according to one account.

The Partnership got some help from the pop culture movie industry. In 1999, filmmaker Robert Zemeckis made a documentary entitled The Pursuit of Happiness: Smoking, Drinking and Drugging in the 20th Century which made an in-depth examination of the problem of drug use, covering 100 years and interviewing professionals and historians. Zemeckis included Marston in the documentary film. The film suggested, among other things, that "American society has habitually criminalized the substances used primarily by minorities" such as opium for Asian immigrants and marijuana and cocaine for African-Americans while legalizing those of white adults such as beer, alcohol and tobacco. In addition, the documentary suggested that the 1920–1933 alcohol prohibition was a result of entrepreneurs such as Henry Ford needing sober assembly line workers. Marston commented later in the New York Times:

The 2000s

The firm continued its efforts to make drug use look uncool, in part by getting celebrities to help them break the "age-old stereotype of sex, drugs, rock-'n'- roll going together with everything cool", according to Marston commenting on CNN. Celebrities such as Lauryn Hill and the Dixie Chicks came forward to say they're "drug-free".

In 2002, Burke retired as chairman, and was replaced by Roy J. Bostock.

Tracking research showed a decline in usage of alcohol and cigarettes, and that use of the club drug ecstasy had declined among teens. The Partnership had been tracking ecstasy use since 1996, and found that 52% of students were aware of the dangers associated with its use as compared to 46% from the year before. Marston said:

In the mid-2000s, the Partnership gradually shifted away from de-emphasizing the perils of marijuana and focused more on targets such as prescription drugs, possibly responding to a shift of emphasis by the U.S. government as well as possible indications of declining marijuana usage by teens. Reporter Elizabeth Sprague of CBS News noticed that the Partnership had not produced a single anti-marijuana PSA since 2005. In a conflicting report in 2011, a study suggested that there were "sharp increases in the use of marijuana" as well as ecstasy after "years of declining use." The "frying pan" ad was described as a "relic" in one report, although New York Sun reporter Amanda Gordon noted that the organization gives gold-plated frying pan awards (mounted under glass) at fundraisers. By 2007, the agency had produced over 3,000 spots from 1985 to 2007.

In 2010, the organization changed its name from Partnership for a Drug-Free America to Partnership at Drugfree.org, possibly as a result of increased emphasis on websites and Internet appeals.

Current approaches

In 2011, a study found that marijuana use was increasing, as well as the use of ecstasy and found that 45% of teenagers did not think drinking alcohol was "a big deal." The Partnership was focusing more on teenagers' misuse of prescription drugs; one study they did suggested that on any given day, 2,500 American teens get high for the first time by using prescription medication. The group was part of a campaign known as National Prescription Drug Take Back Day which encouraged residents to dispose of their old prescription drugs to nearby city halls or police departments. Partnership executive Sean Clarkin suggests that parents sit down with their teens and ask "what's going on" as a possible beginning of a conversation. There was one report that the Partnership will be reducing its commitment to broadcast media in favor of an approach of reaching out to parents, particularly via the Internet, which increased from 10% of its budget to 31% for 2010. It has focused on web efforts such as the site "Time to Talk" (timetotalk.org), and is exploring the possibility of advertising on cell phones and possibly in videogames. The drugfree.org website, according to one source, attracts a million visitors each month. The agency is making a $55 million three-year commitment with cable operator Comcast including its "Time to Talk" campaign. There was a report that it will sponsor a toll-free hotline.

Research findings and tracking
The Partnership has consistently done a tracking study as part of an ongoing longitudinal study to assess attitudes towards drugs and alcohol. The survey research helped it keep on top of trends, although since in many cases research organizations were providing studies without cost, the Partnership had less ability to impose a strict study design on some of the efforts. As a result, some surveys, using different questions and designs, conflicted with other survey data, although on key tracking measures, the Partnership was able to follow shifts in teenaged awareness and attitudes towards drugs.

Awards
Over the past two decades, its public service advertisements have grown to target other drugs like heroin, methamphetamine, ecstasy, and others.

Criticism and controversy
PDFA was the subject of criticism when it was revealed by Cynthia Cotts of The Village Voice that their federal tax returns showed that they had received several million dollars worth of funding from major pharmaceutical, tobacco and alcohol corporations including American Brands (Jim Beam whiskey), Philip Morris (Marlboro and Virginia Slims cigarettes, Miller beer), Anheuser Busch (Budweiser, Michelob, Busch beer), R.J. Reynolds (Camel, Salem, Winston cigarettes), as well as pharmaceutical firms Bristol Meyers-Squibb, Merck & Company and Procter & Gamble. In 1997, it discontinued any direct fiscal association with tobacco and alcohol suppliers, although it still receives donations from pharmaceutical companies. There has been criticism that some of its PSAs have had "little proven effect on drug use."

Satire
Some of the campaigns run by the PDFA have been either satirized or referred to in popular media.

In the comedy film Harold & Kumar Go to White Castle (2004), John Cho and Kal Penn's characters are watching the Harmless PSA while intoxicated from marijuana. The advertisement in question features two teen boys smoking marijuana; one of them handles a gun and then fatally shoots himself, saying, "I'm so high, nothing can hurt me!"

On a segment of The Daily Show, Ed Helms showed a PDFA advertisement in which a stoned teenager takes out a gun and, not realizing that it is loaded, shoots his friend. At the end of the PSA Helms says, "Obviously this is a very effective commercial ... for gun control. Come on parents, what were you thinking, leaving a loaded gun around teenagers? Are you high or something?"

In the comedy film Scary Movie 2 (2001), Marlon Wayans  and Chris Elliott's characters are parodying the brain dinner scene from Hannibal with Beetlejuice revealed as the brain, who then states before laughing, "This is your brain on drugs!"

The South Park episode "My Future Self 'n' Me" reflects on some campaigns run by the PDFA.

The Family Guy episode "Boys Do Cry" featured the character Meg lying on the couch deflated in reference to a PDFA commercial.

A sketch on Chappelle's Show parodied a PDFA commercial where a group of stoned young men runs over a young girl on a bike while leaving a drive-thru. The sketch featured the cast of Half Baked in character running over a small girl, only to reveal that the young girl was also stoned and is otherwise unscathed.

Heart of the Matter with Elizabeth Vargas Podcast 
In October 2020, Partnership to End Addiction launched a new podcast with board member Elizabeth Vargas, who serves as the podcast's host. Heart of the Matter with Elizabeth Vargas gives guests the opportunity to share their personal, candid stories about addiction. It offers a space to open up about substance use and mental health, to share the ways in which people are shifting their narrative – in their own relationships and across communities – to support the cause of ending addiction in our country. New episodes are released every other Tuesday, and available here or wherever you get your podcasts.

Vargas, who is in recovery herself, on the topic of the podcast said to Variety, "There isn’t a day that goes by I’m not profoundly grateful for my sobriety. I never take it for granted. I remember being told you have to hold it like a delicate egg in your hands." While Vargas was seeking sobriety, her anonymity was stripped from her. She states it was "one of the most devastating things to happen. It was very difficult. There’s a huge amount of stigma around this disease. That’s why fewer than 20% of the people who need help get it."

The Partnership for Drug-Free Kids and The National Center on Addiction and Substance Abuse (CASA) Merger 
in July 2020, After merging, Partnership for Drug-Free Kids and The National Center on Addiction and Substance Abuse (CASA) are now Partnership to End Addiction at drugfree.org. In tandem, it has launched a new brand identity and redesigned website at drugfree.org. The changes are part of an evolution following the 2019 merger of two distinguished leaders in the substance addiction space. They also align with the organization's ongoing efforts to address community needs at a time of increased national uncertainty exacerbating the addiction crisis.

"Partnership to End Addiction is a name that reflects both the legacy of our combined organization, as well as our dedication to partnering with experts, advocates and other organizations to address this public health crisis together," said Creighton Drury, CEO of Partnership to End Addiction. "We are living through an unprecedented time. Amid this uncertainty, families need to know they aren't alone. We are here to help them get through whatever challenges they may be facing, with support and free resources."

The new website provides critical information for families impacted by addiction, as well as policymakers, researchers and health care professionals in the addiction space. Family members seeking guidance and information can access the organization's educational content on treatment, recovery and prevention in addition to one-on-one support from trained helpline specialists. They can also learn about advocating for policy changes, leading efforts in their own communities and volunteering with Partnership to End Addiction. Professionals in government, research and health care can engage with the organization's state- and federal-level policy and advocacy work, professional services, partnership opportunities, and addiction research and science.

Partnership to End Addiction's updated logo, a combined heart and check, reflects its unique approach to ending addiction with a mix of heart and science, compassion and expertise. Its new brand design demonstrates the broad spectrum of the nonprofit's activities and its evolution as a combined organization now working on all fronts to solve our nation's addiction crisis.

See also
 Ad Council
 Ginna Marston
 This Is Your Brain on Drugs
 Public service announcement

Notes
All actors in PDFA television and radio spots appear without fee, courtesy of an agreement with the Screen Actors Guild and the American Federation of Television and Radio Artists.

Sources

External links
Official Partnership for Drug-Free Kids website

Civic and political organizations of the United States
Non-profit organizations based in New York City
Public service announcement organizations
Organizations established in 1985
1985 establishments in the United States
Drug policy of the United States